Lawrence E. Watson (31 October 1917 – 22 December 1990) was a Progressive Conservative party member of the House of Commons of Canada. He was born in Avonlea, Saskatchewan and became a farmer and farmer by career.

He was first elected at the Assiniboia riding in 
the 1963 general election after an unsuccessful attempt to win the riding in 1962. Watson was re-elected there in 1965 but defeated in 1968. He also contested an 8 November 1971 by-election at Assiniboia but again was unable to win back the seat in Parliament.

External links
 

1917 births
1990 deaths
Members of the House of Commons of Canada from Saskatchewan
Progressive Conservative Party of Canada MPs